Shirish Srivastava (born 1 December 1963) is an Indian former cricketer. He played first-class cricket for Assam and Delhi between 1984 and 1990.

See also
 List of Delhi cricketers

References

External links
 

1963 births
Living people
Indian cricketers
Assam cricketers
Delhi cricketers
Cricketers from Delhi